William Ward Selby (unknown – 29 January 1892) was an English cricketer. Selby's batting style is unknown. He was born at Nottingham, Nottinghamshire and was christened there on 6 April 1823.

Selby made a single first-class appearance for Nottinghamshire against Sussex County Cricket Club at Trent Bridge in 1848. He was dismissed for 28 runs in Nottinghamshire's first-innings by James Hodson, with the match ending as a draw.

He died at the city of his birth on 29 January 1892.

References

External links
William Selby at ESPNcricinfo
William Selby at CricketArchive

Year of birth unknown
1892 deaths
Cricketers from Nottingham
English cricketers
Nottinghamshire cricketers